The Howrah Indoor Stadium is a multi-purpose indoor stadium located at Dumurjala, Howrah, West Bengal, India. It is the only indoor stadium in Howrah district, designed as a venue for indoor sports, cultural events and other programs.

Formation

In the 1980s the stadium was made on the margin of Dumurjala, a neighborhood of Santragachi, Shibpur and Ramrajatala, by Howrah Improvement Trust. Based on the line of Netaji Indoor Stadium, Kolkata, it was originally planned for indoor sports activities. After the construction, only two state-level indoor matches were organized. Then defects in the construction of the galleries and floor came to the forefront. After that Howrah Municipal Corporation took the stadium and started using it for commercial needs.

Reformation and development
In 2018, West Bengal Housing Infrastructure Development Corporation (HIDCO) planned Dumurjala to be the Sports City. A meeting was held in Howrah among state Urban Development minister Firhad Hakim, Mayor Rathin Chakraborty and Debashis Sen, chairman, HIDCO, along with senior officials of HMC at HIDCO. The meeting stated Dumurjala Stadium to be rebuilt and more developed to meet the state level.

Facilities
The stadium has a capacity of 6000 seats.
The stadium is centrally air-conditioned. 
The floor is made of teak and the other part of synthetic wood. 
It has two dressing rooms, a power room, a commentary box, a guesthouse.

References

1980s establishments in West Bengal
Sports in Howrah
Sports venues in West Bengal
Sports venues completed in the 1980s
20th-century architecture in India